In mathematics, the Hjelmslev transformation is an effective method for mapping an entire hyperbolic plane into a circle with a finite radius. The transformation was invented by Danish mathematician Johannes Hjelmslev. It utilizes Nikolai Ivanovich Lobachevsky's 23rd theorem from his work Geometrical Investigations on the Theory of Parallels.

Lobachevsky observes, using a combination of his 16th and 23rd theorems, that it is a fundamental characteristic of hyperbolic geometry that there must exist a distinct angle of parallelism for any given line length. Let us say for the length AE, its angle of parallelism is angle BAF. This being the case, line AH and EJ will be hyperparallel, and therefore will never meet. Consequently, any line drawn perpendicular to base AE between A and E must necessarily cross line AH at some finite distance. Johannes Hjelmslev discovered from this a method of compressing an entire hyperbolic plane into a finite circle. The method is as follows: for any angle of parallelism, draw from its line AE a perpendicular to the other ray; using that cutoff length, e.g., AH, as the radius of a circle, "map" the point H onto the line AE. This point H thus mapped must fall between A and E. By applying this process for every line within the plane, the infinite hyperbolic space thus becomes contained and planar. Hjelmslev's transformation does not yield a proper circle however. The circumference of the circle created does not have a corresponding location within the plane, and therefore, the product of a Hjelmslev transformation is more aptly called a Hjelmslev Disk. Likewise, when this transformation is extended in all three dimensions, it is referred to as a Hjelmslev Ball.

There are a few properties that are retained through the transformation which enable valuable information to be ascertained therefrom, namely:

The image of a circle sharing the center of the transformation will be a circle about this same center.
As a result, the images of all the right angles with one side passing through the center will be right angles.
Any angle with the center of the transformation as its vertex will be preserved.
The image of any straight line will be a finite straight line segment.
Likewise, the point order is maintained throughout a transformation, i.e. if B is between A and C, the image of B will be between the image of A and the image of C.
The image of a rectilinear angle is a rectilinear angle.

The Hjelmslev transformation and the Klein model
If we represent hyperbolic space by means of the Klein model, and take the center of the Hjelmslev transformation to be the center point of the Klein model, then the Hjelmslev transformation maps points in the unit disk to points in a disk centered at the origin with a radius less than one. Given a real number k, the Hjelmslev transformation, if we ignore rotations, is in effect what we obtain by mapping a vector u representing a point in the Klein model to
ku, with 0<k<1. It is therefore in terms of the model a uniform scaling which sends lines to lines and so forth. To beings living in a hyperbolic space it might be a suitable way of making a map.

See also
 Hjelmslev's theorem

References

Hyperbolic geometry